The Isaac Block House is a historic house at 404 East Hamilton Street in Wynne, Arkansas.  It is a -story wood-frame structure, locally notable for its fine Queen Anne styling.  On the exterior this is evident in the wraparound porch, the use of fish-scale wood shingles, a projecting gable with carved decoration, and projecting bays that are similarly decorated.  The house was built in Wittsburg in about 1885 by Isaac Block, a merchant son of German Jewish immigrants.  After the railroad bypassed Wittsburg, Block decided to move the house to Wynne, a feat accomplished in the early 1900s by cutting the house into sections and hauling them on oversized wagons to the present location.

The house was listed on the National Register of Historic Places in 1998.

See also
National Register of Historic Places listings in Cross County, Arkansas

References

Houses on the National Register of Historic Places in Arkansas
Queen Anne architecture in Arkansas
Houses completed in 1885
Houses in Cross County, Arkansas
National Register of Historic Places in Cross County, Arkansas